William Aislabie (3 December 1671 – 10 November 1725) was a British governor of the Bombay Presidency during the days of the East India Company.

Life
Aislabie was the fifth son of George Aislabie, of Studley Royal, and brother of John Aislabie. He was deputy Governor from 1704, following the death of John Burniston. He assumed the post of Governor in September 1708 and left office on 11 October 1715.

At the end of his life, his brother John Aislabie bought the Waverley Abbey estate from the Coldham family and set about building a house there for him. Unfortunately William died around the time the house was ready and the Waverley estate was sold.

Family
Aislabie married a daughter of John Burniston. Their son William married in 1728 Elizabeth Scattergood, daughter of the merchant John Scattergood. The army officer John Aislabie (born 1729) was their son.

References

Governors of Bombay
18th-century British people
1671 births
1725 deaths